Grand Caravan to the Rim of the World is the second studio album by American hip hop group 3 Melancholy Gypsys. It was released on Legendary Music in 2005.

Track listing

Personnel
Credits adapted from liner notes.

 Eligh – vocals, production (1–4, 6, 7, 9, 10, 13–16, 18)
 Murs – vocals, production (5, 11, 12)
 Scarub – vocals, production (8)
 Ringmaster Roc – vocals (11)
 Belief – production (12)
 Jo Wilkinson – vocals (15)
 Magi – production (17)
 Mystic – vocals (18)

References

External links
 

2000 albums
Murs (rapper) albums
Eligh albums